Kenai Group is a name given by Dall and Harris (1892)  to sedimentary rocks in the Cook Inlet Basin, Alaska. These rocks are instead called the Kenai Formation by several other authors.

See also
Kenai Peninsula

References

Geology of Alaska
Cenozoic Alaska